The Embassy of Canada to Russia in Moscow is the diplomatic mission of Canada to Russia. Included in its mandate are the countries of Armenia and Uzbekistan. It also provides visa services to residents of Belarus, Kazakhstan, Kyrgyzstan and Tajikistan.

As of June 2018, to service such a vast area, the mission was staffed with 30 Canadian diplomats who were supported by 70 locally engaged personnel, based in the chancery and three other buildings, and a fleet of 8 vehicles. From Moscow, Canada also supports honorary consulates in Vladivostok, Tashkent (Uzbekistan), and Yerevan (Armenia). A consulate general in St. Petersburg was closed in March 2007.

Located at 23 Starokonyushenny Pereulok in the Khamovniki District of Moscow, the three-storey yellow and white Art Nouveau style chancery also houses the ambassador's official residence on the top floor.

In Canada, Russia is represented by its embassy in Ottawa, consulates general in Toronto and Montreal, and honorary consulates in Vancouver, Edmonton, Windsor, ON, and St. John's, NL.

See also 
 Canada–Russia relations
 Diplomatic missions in Russia
 List of ambassadors of Canada to Russia

References

External links 
 Embassy of Canada to Russia

Canada–Russia relations
Canada–Soviet Union relations
Canada
Moscow
Khamovniki District
Art Nouveau architecture in Moscow
Art Nouveau houses
Houses completed in 1898
Cultural heritage monuments of regional significance in Moscow